Senator Hough may refer to:

Alanson Hodges Hough (1803–1886), Connecticut State Senate
Benjamin Hough (1773–1819), Ohio State Senate
Michael Hough (politician) (born 1979), Maryland State Senate
Olmstead Hough (1797–1865), Michigan State Senate
Ralph D. Hough (born 1943), New Hampshire State Senate

See also
Senator Huff (disambiguation)